Stenus juno is a species of predatory beetle in the family Staphylinidae. It is found in Europe and North America.

References

Further reading

External links

 

Steninae
Articles created by Qbugbot